
Year 622 (DCXXII) was a common year starting on Friday (link will display the full calendar) of the Julian calendar, the 622nd year of the Common Era (CE) and Anno Domini (AD) designations, the 622nd year of the 1st millennium, the 22nd year of the 7th century, and the 3rd year of the 620s decade. The denomination 622 for this year has been used since the early medieval period, when the Anno Domini calendar era became the prevalent method in Europe for naming years.

Events 
 By place 

 Byzantine Empire 
 Byzantine–Sasanian War: Emperor Heraclius sails from Constantinople with an expeditionary force (probably 50,000 men), and starts a counter-offensive against the Persian Empire (his young son, Constantine III, is left behind as regent under the charge of Sergius I, patriarch of Constantinople, and patrician Bonus). He lands a few days later at the junction of Cilicia and Syria, near Alexandretta and ancient Issus.
 Battle of Issus: Heraclius defeats the Persian forces under Shahrbaraz in Cappadocia. He recaptures Anatolia, but returns to Constantinople to deal with the threat posed to his Balkan domains by the Avars, and puts the Byzantine army into winter quarters in Pontus.

 Asia 
 The Western Turks conquer the Oxus valley and cooperate with Heraclius against Persia, taking Khorasan (modern Afghanistan).

Central America
March 28 – Tajoom Ukʼab Kʼahkʼ becomes the ruler of the Mayan city state of Calakmul in southern Mexico and reigns until 630.

 By topic 

 Religion 
 September 9 or June 17 – The Islamic prophet Muhammad, after being warned of a plot to assassinate him, secretly leaves his home in Mecca to make the Hijrah (emigrate) to Yathrib (later renamed by him Medina), along with his companion Abu Bakr. They take refuge in the Cave of Thawr south of Mecca for three days, departing on September 13 or June 21.
 September 20 or June 28 – Muhammad does not enter Yathrib directly, but stops at its outlying environs of Quba. He establishes the Quba Mosque here, the first mosque of Islam. On July 2 (or September 24) he makes his first visit to Yathrib for Friday prayers.
 October 4 or July 13 – After a fourteen days' stay in Quba, Muhammad finally moves from Quba to Yathrib, and is greeted cordially by its people. Here he drafts the Constitution of Medina, an agreement between the various Muslim, Jewish, Christian and pagan tribal communities in the city, forming the basis of a multi-religious Islamic state, and begins construction of the Al-Masjid an-Nabawi Mosque. Later during the caliphate of Umar in 638, the lunar year during which the emigration to Medina occurred (Friday 16 July 622 – 4 July 623) is designated "Year One" of the new Hijri era (Anno Hegirae – AH).
 Xuanzang is fully ordained as a Buddhist monk at the age of 20.

 Births 
 Al-Mukhtar, Islamic revolutionary (d. 687)
 Bavo, Frankish nobleman and saint (d. 659)
 Mezezius, Byzantine usurper (d. 669)
 Uqba ibn Nafi, Arab general (d. 683)
 Xue Yuanchao, official of the Tang dynasty (d. 683)

 Deaths 
 April 8 – Shōtoku, prince and regent of Japan (b. 574)
 Andronicus, Coptic Orthodox Patriarch of Alexandria
 Colmán mac Cobthaig, king of Connacht (Ireland)
 John of Biclaro, Visigoth chronicler (approximate date)
 Li Zitong, rebel leader during the Sui dynasty
 Lin Shihong, rebel leader during the Sui dynasty
 Liu Wuzhou, rebel leader during the Sui dynasty
 Walid ibn al-Mughirah, chief of the Banu Makhzum clan of the Quraysh tribe.

References

Sources